Alfred Winsor Brown II (November 6, 1885 – September 7, 1938) was a United States Navy captain who served as the 31st naval governor of Guam. He graduated from the United States Naval Academy in 1907, serving aboard a number of ships in many different capacities soon after. From 1924 to 1926, he served as Guamanian governor before attending the Naval War College and serving on the staff of a number of high-ranking naval officers.

Early life 
On November 6, 1885, Brown was born as 
Alfred Winsor Brown, II in Chelsea, Massachusetts. Brown's father was Alfred Winsor Brown, I (1857-1922). Brown's mother was Meribah Tallman (nee Josselyn) Brown (1855-1939).

Career
Brown entered the United States Naval Academy in 1903, graduating in 1907. In 1906, he began service aboard , transferring to Asiatic Squadron and the USS Rhode Island until 1912. In 1914, he transferred to  before becoming navigator aboard . For 1916, he served as executive officer aboard .

In 1917, Brown returned to the Naval Academy as a staff member.

On July 25, 1919,  launched with Brown in command and served with the Pacific Fleet. He was stationed at the Puget Sound Naval Shipyard and Intermediate Maintenance Facility from 1923 until August 1924.

Brown then served as Governor of Guam from August 26, 1924, to August 7, 1926. 
While still a governor, from 1925 Brown was also a member and recorder of the Board of Inspection and Survey.

From 1930 to 1931, Brown attended the Naval War College, after which he served in the office of the Assistant Secretary of the Navy and the office of the Chief of Naval Operations.

During his career, he earned three medals: the Mexican Service Medal, the World War I Victory Medal, and the Order of Abdon Calderon.

Personal life 
In 1912, Brown married Marguerite Boynton. They had four children, Alfred Winsor Brown, Jr., Barbara Brown, Jean Brown, and Mary Boynton Brown.

On September 7, 1938, Brown died of a heart attack in an apartment hotel in Long Beach, California. Brown's funeral service took place aboard . Brown is interred at Arlington National Cemetery on September 14, 1938.

References

1885 births
1938 deaths
Governors of Guam
United States Naval Academy alumni
United States Naval Academy faculty
People from Chelsea, Massachusetts
Burials at Arlington National Cemetery
Naval War College alumni
Military personnel from Massachusetts